Pultenaea insularis is a species of flowering plant in the family Fabaceae and is endemic to Kangaroo Island in South Australia. It is a spreading to prostrate shrub with wiry branches, elliptic leaves, and yellow and red flowers.

Description

Taxonomy and naming
Pultenaea insularis was first formally described in 1995 by Joseph Zvonko Weber in Journal of the Adelaide Botanic Gardens from specimens collected in Beyeria Conservation Park in 1992. The specific epithet (insularis) refers to the type location on Kangaroo Island.

Distribution and habitat
This pultenaea grows in open forest often matted around tree trunks or in high grass and is only known from the eastern end of Kangaroo Island in South Australia.

References

insularis
Flora of South Australia
Plants described in 1995